Jasmine Hassell (born April 9, 1991) is a professional basketball player who last played for the Indiana Fever of the WNBA. She played college basketball at the University of Georgia. Hassell is a Signature athlete of Hoops Mechanic basketball training and is under contract to play in Israel in 2015/2016.

Georgia  statistics

Source

See also
Georgia Lady Bulldogs basketball

References

External links
Jasmine Hassell at fibaeurope.com
Jasmine Hassell WNBA Stats
Georgia Lady Bulldogs bio

1991 births
Living people
American women's basketball players
Basketball players from Tennessee
Forwards (basketball)
Georgia Lady Bulldogs basketball players
Indiana Fever draft picks
Indiana Fever players
McDonald's High School All-Americans
Parade High School All-Americans (girls' basketball)
Seattle Storm players